Fly Jinnah or FJ is a low cost carrier (LCC) owned and operated jointly by Lakson Group of Pakistan and Air Arabia Group of the United Arab Emirates. Fly Jinnah has started domestic flight operations on November 1, 2022.

Destinations

Fleet

References

External links
 – official website

Airlines of Pakistan
Airlines established in 2021
Low-cost carriers